Operation Amsterdam is a 1959 black and white British action film, directed by Michael McCarthy, and featuring Peter Finch, Eva Bartok and Tony Britton. It is based on a true story as described in the book Adventure in Diamonds, by David E. Walker. The action of the story covers 12–13 May 1940 (Whit Sunday and Whit Monday) during the German invasion of the Netherlands. The composer Philip Green composed two original pieces of music for the film, the Pierement Waltz and the Amsterdam Polka.

Plot

In May 1940, as the German invasion of the Netherlands is under way, the British government decides to send a team to the Netherlands on board   to secure stocks of industrial diamonds before the invaders can get to them. Accordingly, two Dutch diamond experts, Jan Smit (Peter Finch) and Walter Keyser (Alexander Knox), with a British Army Intelligence officer, Major Dillon (Tony Britton), are dropped by ship off the Dutch coast. They survive a German air raid and escape the attention of a suspicious Dutch policeman. Needing a car, they commandeer one driven by Anna (Eva Bartok), who is trying to commit suicide because she blames herself for the death of her Jewish fiance's parents. Anna turns out to be a member of the Dutch security forces and agrees to help the mission.

The four of them drive to Amsterdam where they meet Jan's father, Johan (Malcolm Keen), at his diamond business house. Johan agrees to try to persuade other dealers to bring their diamonds later that day for transport to Britain. However, many of the stones are stored in a time-locked bank vault which won't open for 24 hours because of the Whit Monday holiday so they recruit Dillon's contacts, a Dutch resistance group, to break in.

Fifth columnist elements in the Dutch army launch an attack outside the bank but the group manage to break into the vault and recover the diamonds. Jan kills the leader of the fifth columnists, a Dutch army lieutenant (Tim Turner). While the resistance fighters withstand the attack, the three agents and Anna make their escape. They drive back to the coast, dodging a German air attack on the way, but find that their boatmaster has been killed. They commandeer a tugboat to take them back to the waiting destroyer, but Anna elects to remain in the Netherlands and work with the nascent resistance movement.

Cast
 Peter Finch as Jan Smit 
 Eva Bartok as Anna 
 Tony Britton as Major Dillon 
 Alexander Knox as Walter Keyser
 Malcolm Keen as Johan Smit
 Petra Davies as Menschi (Johan's assistant)
 Alfred Burke as dealer working with Johan 
 Christopher Rhodes as Alex (resistance leader)
 Peter Swanwick as Peter (safecracker)
 John Le Mesurier as Colonel Janssen (Anna's security force contact)
 Tim Turner as Dutch lieutenant (leader of fifth columnists)
 John Horsley as Commander Bowerman 
 Melvyn Hayes as Willem 
 Carl Jaffe as diamond merchant 
 Keith Pyott as diamond merchant 
 Oscar Quitak as diamond merchant 
 Karel Štěpánek as diamond merchant
 Frederick Schiller as tugmaster
 George Pravda as portmaster 
 John Bailey as suspicious Dutch police officer in port

Production
The film was based on a true story. British intelligence smuggled out ten million pounds worth of industrial diamonds from Smit's Diamonds in Amsterdam. This was turned into a book Adventure in Diamonds by British journalist David Walker, which forms the basis of the film. Jan Schmidt, who Finch plays, was killed in 1946 and the character of Anna disappeared.

Filming started 7 July 1958. It was shot at Pinewood Studios and on location in Amsterdam. Peter Finch told the press during filming: "I like my part in the film, it is one of my strongest". He made the movie under his contract with the Rank organisation. According to Tony Britton, who co-starred, Finch was unhappy with the movie and offered Britton the choice of either lead as he felt "it's all the same to me. Get the bloody film over and let me off the hook."

Reception
Variety said it had "plenty of excitement... a well-conceived and smoothly holding piece of film 
making". The Guardian called it "an unusually effective war film, partly because it is so largely true, partly because its scene... is so eerie and unfamiliar".

The film was one of seven Rank films bought for distribution in the US by 20th Century Fox. The others were Upstairs and Downstairs, Sink the Bismarck!, Northwest Frontier, Ferry to Hong Kong, The Wind Cannot Read and The Captain's Table.

The New York Times said "a surprisingly lukewarm drama has been culled from this tingling, true-life incident... Although it offers some fine tense panoramas of its doomed background, the picture remains curiously conventional in size and scope.... Not until the finale does the picture really get off its haunches.There are two consistent assets, one being a crisp, direct performance by Mr. Britton, as the realistic leader of the daring trio. First, last and always, there is Amsterdam itself."

Director Michael McCarthy died on 7 May 1959.

References

External links 

Operation Amsterdam at BFI
Operation Amsterdam at Letterbox DVD
Operation Amsterdam at Reel Streets
Adventure in Diamonds — source novel

1959 war films
1959 films
1950s British films
1950s English-language films
British World War II films
Western Front of World War II films
World War II films based on actual events
Films set in Amsterdam
Films set in the Netherlands
Films shot at Pinewood Studios